My Life Check Me Out is the debut solo album by Rapper J-Money, one half of the rap duo Cadillac Don & J-Money. It charted at No. 85 on the Billboard Top R&B/Hip-Hop Albums chart, selling nearly 10,000 copies, including 1,500 in its first week.

Track listing 

 Check Me Out (Featuring Jim Jones & C-Sharp)
 I Luve Da Trap
 I'm Ballin (Featuring Rick Ross)
 Give Her To Me (Featuring Recognition)
 First Class
 Relaxx (Featuring Diesel & C-Sharp)
 F**kin Buddies Skit
 F**kin Buddies (Featuring C-Sharp)
 She Bad (Featuring Lil Boosie)
 Street Boy (Featuring Yo Gotti & Tremble)
 Get It Right (Featuring Slim Thug)
 Got To Get Her (Featuring Romain)
 Hey What It Is (Featuring Diesel)
 Thugged Out (Featuring 8Ball & MJG)
 Where I Come From (Featuring Diesel & C-Sharp)
 26's (Featuring C-Sharp)
 She Bad Remix (Featuring Cadillac Don & Jackie-O)

References 
^ Woods, Meiko. https://web.archive.org/web/20130716203411/http://jmoneylive.com/ Official J-Money website, December 5, 2011.

2009 albums
Cadillac Don & J-Money albums